X Tour may refer to:

 x Tour (Ed Sheeran), 2015
 The X Tour (Christina Aguilera), 2019
 "X Tour", Ambassador 21, 2011
 "The X-Tour", see Spock's Beard discography
 Dyro & Bassjackers Present X Tour, Dyro, 2014
KylieX2008, 2008

See also
 Japan Dome Tour X, a concert tour by Big Bang
 X (disambiguation)